Miabi is a territory of the Kasai-Oriental province of the Democratic Republic of the Congo.

Miabi is also a town within the territory; it was founded in 1933 by Kazadi Diofua after his release (he was imprisoned for 10 years by the local colonial power for rebelling and demanding the autonomy of his people). Kazadi Diofua was the last King of the Bakwa Dishi and uncle of the present heir to the throne André-Philippe Futa. Miabi considered the capital of the land of the Bakwa Dishi, is the place of birth of André-Philippe Futa.

Other significance
Miabi is a word in Tshiluba which is the plural form of "muabi", a tree of light greyish leaves with  a white trunk and branches which is typically found in the current territory of Miabi.

In the tradition of the Bakwa Dishi (the people inhabiting this region), this tree is used to bless a man or a woman (the tree was planted accompanied by ceremonies of blessings).

Populated places in Kasaï-Oriental